The 9th Biathlon World Championships were held in 1969 in Zakopane, Poland.

Men's results

20 km individual

4 × 7.5 km relay

Medal table

References

1969
Biathlon World Championships
International sports competitions hosted by Poland
1969 in Polish sport
Sports competitions in Zakopane
February 1969 sports events in Europe
March 1969 sports events in Europe
Biathlon competitions in Poland